Gladys Pizarro is an American A&R executive, noteworthy for co-founding the legendary New York-based house-music record label Strictly Rhythm.

References

A&R people
Living people
Year of birth missing (living people)
Place of birth missing (living people)